Jaan Raamot (9 August 1873, Avaste – 5 January 1927, Jäneda) was an Estonian agrarian personnel, politician, pedagogue.

He was a member of Estonian Provincial Assembly and Asutav Kogu.

His spouse was Mari Raamot.

References

1873 births
1927 deaths
People from Märjamaa Parish
People from Kreis Wiek
Farmers' Assemblies politicians
Members of the Estonian Provincial Assembly
Members of the Estonian Constituent Assembly